Monty Miranda is an American film director. His first feature film, Skills Like This, won the Best Narrative Feature Audience Award at the SXSW Film Festival. The film released theatrically on March 20, 2009, on DVD November 17, 2009 and premiered on Starz, the premium cable television channel on December 31, 2009. https://buffalo8.com/portfolio/monty-miranda/

Skills Like This screened worldwide on the film festival circuit prior to its American theatrical release by Shadow Distribution in 2009. The film received positive reviews from publications ranging from The New York Times and Variety  to Salon.com. In her review for The New York Times, Jeanette Catsoulis wrote, "the offbeat chemistry of the cast, along with Monty Miranda's eye-catching direction...make all the difference... Drawing much of its energy from an eclectic and fully integrated soundtrack, "Skills Like This" gazes indulgently on 20-something aimlessness and the comfort of assigned roles. In Mr. Miranda's hands sloth can be more appealing than you might think." Variety further stated that the main characters of Skills Like This showed "considerable intelligence and chemistry" in addition to calling the film "deftly directed"  and from Salon Andrew O'Heir reviewed Skills Like This as "Cheerfully anarchic ... indescribably genuine."  New Video Group, reviewing the DVD, said the film "bristles with rock'n'roll energy—underscored by the sounds of Denver's music scene". The film screened in theatrical release for four months.

Following graduation from the University of Colorado where he studied Film and Journalism, Monty Miranda founded the commercial production company Incite Films which launched his directing career. Miranda's producer on Skills Like This was the documentary Academy Award winner Donna Dewey.

The Insomniac is the second feature film directed by Monty Miranda. His first film, Skills Like This (which stars Spencer Berger, who plays Andrew Booker in The Insomniac), won the award for Best Narrative Feature at the South by Southwest film festival. Salazar came up with the idea for the script when he caught someone breaking into his house after a scheduled meeting was canceled. Although nothing happened to him or his house, Salazar didn't sleep at all, thinking about what could've happened if he went to the meeting. On a radio interview, Salazar revealed that he couldn't sleep profoundly for two weeks due to the ambient sounds outside his house, fearing that someone was trying to break in again. This led to the writing of the script. The movie also stars Danny Trejo and John Heard (actor).

Principal photography took only 18 days, with two extra days for pick-ups. Grand Entertainment Group is distributes.

Miranda's third feature film is a 3D documentary American Mustang described as an "artful blend of exquisite nature documentary and character-driven narrative, the majestic wild horses of the American West are revealed in stereoscopic 3D as never before. The wonder in a girl's eye pulls us into the drama that unfolds on hundreds of millions of acres of public land. The battle lines have long been carved into the landscape, and the players are deeply entrenched. Yet as the subtle choreography that has evolved over thousands of years begins, we are captivated. The intricate dance between a man and a wild horse presents lessons for us all, even the battle-hardened special interest groups fighting for the place of the AMERICAN MUSTANG."  American Mustang is Narrated by Daryl Hannah.

Early work
Miranda began directing commercials and co-created the first TV series about VIDEO GAMES, called TWITCH. Monty Miranda would make his directorial TV SERIES debut with TWITCH at just 26 years old creating it's overall style and vision. The show was loaded with that signature 90’s “attitude” and “MTV/grunge” visual aesthetic. Featuring quick cuts, extreme camera movements and “cool kids” reading goofy 90’s review copy off a teleprompter, it literally checks all the boxes for a hardcore 90’s videogame nostalgia trip…] Miranda's work became known for its diverse use of music and keen sense of comedy. 

He has directed commercials for companies including TiVo, McDonald's and Redbox, as well as writing and directing the launch promotions for BET Movies (now Starz inBlack). His work has additionally been recognised by the Cannes Lions International Advertising Festival, the CLIO's, the Effie Award, the Addy's, BBC's Most Outrageous Commercials, the Broadcast Design Association and FOX's World's Funniest Commercials. His award-winning political spots have been featured in the national press. CNN, the Los Angeles Times and The Washington Post praised the ads for their innovative approach and contribution to a landslide upset victory by brew master restaurateur and political neophyte John Hickenlooper, helping him to win the Denver mayor's office by the largest margin in history.

Awards and nominations
SXSW Film Festival – Best Narrative Feature Audience Award
Edinburgh International Film Festival – Best of the Fest
Warsaw International Film Festival – "Free Spirit" Special Jury Award Nomination
Jacksonville Film Festival – Jury Prize Award for Best USA Feature Narrative
The Rocky Mountain News "Top 25 Movers and Shakers Art, Entertainment, and Culture, 2008"

References

Interviews
IndieWire Interview
San Francisco Chronicle
Film Click Interview
Radio Alice
Movie Web Interview
Kultur&Nöje
Killer Film
https://buffalo8.com/portfolio/monty-miranda/

External links
 
 

American film directors
Living people
University of Colorado alumni
Year of birth missing (living people)